Black Holiday is a 1973 Italian political drama film directed by Marco Leto and starring Adolfo Celi.

Cast
 Adolfo Celi as Commissioner Rizzuto
 Adalberto Maria Merli as Franco Rossini
 John Steiner as Scagnetti
 Luigi Uzzo as Massanesi
 Aldo De Correllis as Prisoner
 Gianfranco Barra as Priest
 Silvio Anselmo as Inventor
 Vito Cipolla as Renzetti
 Roberto Herlitzka as Guasco
 Biagio Pelligra as Mastrodonato
 Giuliano Petrelli as Nino
 Nello Riviè as Prisoner
 Milena Vukotic as Daria Rossini

References

External links

1973 films
Italian drama films
1970s Italian-language films
1970s political drama films
1973 directorial debut films
1973 drama films
1970s Italian films